Totten is a mountain located in the Hemsedal municipality in Norway. It is a part of Hemsedal Top 20. 
Some of the hike to the peak can be done by travelling with one of Hemsedal's many ski lifts.

Mountains of Viken